Arnold Sidney Stang (September 28, 1918 – December 20, 2009) was an American comic actor.

Early life
Arnold Stang was born on September 28, 1918, in New York City to a Jewish Family.

Career
Stang claimed he gained his break in radio by sending a postcard to a New York station requesting an audition, was accepted, and then bought his own ticket to New York from Chelsea, Massachusetts, with the money set aside for his mother's anniversary gift. Though his widow, JoAnne Stang, explained upon his death that this story was untrue, Stang did work on New York–based network radio shows as a teenager, appearing on children's programs such as The Horn and Hardart Children's Hour and Let's Pretend. By 1940, he had graduated to teenaged roles, appearing as Seymour on The Goldbergs. Director Don Bernard hired him in October 1941 to do the commercials on the CBS program Meet Mr. Meek but decided his constantly cracking voice would hurt the commercial so he ordered scriptwriters to come up with a role for him. He next appeared on the summer replacement show The Remarkable Miss Tuttle with Edna May Oliver in 1942 and replaced Eddie Firestone Jr. in the title role of That Brewster Boy when Firestone joined the U.S. Marine Corps in 1943.

Comedian Henry Morgan made him a sidekick on his program in fall of 1946 and Stang appeared in similar roles the following year on radio shows with Eddie Cantor and Milton Berle. He also did the voice of Jughead for a short while on the Archie Andrews radio show when it was broadcast by NBC.

At this time Stang had appeared in a number of movies, including Seven Days Leave, My Sister Eileen, So This Is New York with Henry Morgan, and They Got Me Covered. He had also appeared on the Broadway stage in Sailor Beware, All In Favor and Same Time Next Week, where he first worked with Berle.

Stang moved to television at the start of the Golden Age. He had a recurring role in the TV show The School House on the DuMont Television Network in 1949. He was a regular on Eddie Mayehoff's short-lived situation comedy Doc Corkle in fall of 1952 as well as comedy relief on Captain Video and His Video Rangers as Clumsy McGee. Then he made a guest appearance on Milton Berle's Texaco Star Theater on May 12, 1953 and joined him as a regular as Francis the Stagehand the following September, often berating or heckling the big-egoed star for big laughs. Stang also had guest roles on several variety shows of the day including The Colgate Comedy Hour. In early 1951, Stang appeared on Henry Morgan's Great Talent Hunt, a take-off of The Original Amateur Hour, as "Gerard", supposedly recruiting "talent" for Morgan.

Stang starred in movie short subjects for producer Edward Montagne in the early 1950s. In 1964, when Montagne was producing his McHale's Navy spinoff Broadside, he recruited Arnold Stang midway through production and gave him co-star billing. Stang joined the ensemble cast as outspoken master chef Stanley Stubbs.

In films, he had a substantial supporting role as the best friend Sparrow in The Man with the Golden Arm (1955) with Frank Sinatra and Kim Novak. In It's a Mad, Mad, Mad, Mad World (1963) he played Ray, who, along with his partner Irwin (Marvin Kaplan), owns a gas station that Jonathan Winters destroys. He appeared in Hello Down There (1969). He partnered with Arnold Schwarzenegger (billed as "Arnold Strong 'Mr. Universe'") in the latter's first film, Hercules in New York (1969).

In 1959, ABC Paramount Records released an album by Stang, entitled Arnold Stang's Waggish Tales.

Stang worked often as a voice actor for animated cartoons, and voiced the title role in Top Cat. The show lasted one season in prime time, 1961–62, before going into reruns. Stang also provided the voice for Popeye's pal Shorty (a caricature of Stang), Herman the mouse in a number of Famous Studios cartoons, Tubby Tompkins in a few Little Lulu shorts, and Catfish on Misterjaw. He also voiced the character Nurtle the Twurtle in the 1965 animated feature Pinocchio in Outer Space.

On television he appeared in commercials for the Chunky candy bar, where he would list many of its ingredients, smile and say, "Chunky, what a chunk of chocolate!" He provided the voice of the Honey Nut Cheerios Bee in the 1980s and was also a spokesman for Vicks Vapo-Rub. As a pitchman for Alcoa aluminum window screens in the late 1960s, he was known for the tag line "Arnold Stang says don't get stung".  Stang also appeared in "The Grave Robber," an episode of the popular horror anthology series Tales from the Darkside, playing Tapok, an ancient Egyptian mummy who encounters some unscrupulous archaeologists who lure him into a game of strip poker.

Stang once described himself as "a frightened chipmunk who's been out in the rain too long." As for his distinctive squawky, nasal Brooklyn voice, he said "I'm kind of attached to it ... [it's] a personal logo. It's like your Jell-O or Xerox.

Later career

Arnold Stang reprised Top Cat in Yogi's Treasure Hunt and Top Cat and the Beverly Hills Cats. Stang also appeared on an episode of The Cosby Show with guest star Sammy Davis Jr. (He also made a cameo appearance in Bill Cosby's 1990 film Ghost Dad.) In one TV advertisement, he played Luther Burbank, proudly showing off his newly invented "square tomato" to fit neatly in typical square slices of commercial bread, then being informed that the advertising bakery had beat him to it by producing round loaves of bread. He played the photographer in the 1993 film Dennis the Menace with Walter Matthau. He also provided many voices for the Cartoon Network series Courage the Cowardly Dog and Turner Program Services' original series Captain Planet and the Planeteers. He had a small role as Queasy the Parrot in the 1977 film Raggedy Ann & Andy: A Musical Adventure.

Stang was in many Broadway stage productions, including Front Page with Peggy Cass in the 1969 revival.

In 1994, he guest-starred as the voice of Irwin the Mouse in the Garfield and Friends episode "Thoroughly Mixed-Up Mouse".

In 2004, Stang made his last appearance in an interview with animator Earl Kress about the making of Top Cat. It is featured on the Top Cat DVD box set.

Personal life
Stang and his wife JoAnne (née Taggart), lived in New Rochelle, New York, and in his later years Greenwich, Connecticut, moving toward the end of his life to Needham, Massachusetts. The couple had two children, David and Deborah. JoAnne Stang was a journalist known for writing profiles of prominent individuals in the entertainment industry.

Stang died of pneumonia at Newton-Wellesley Hospital in Newton, Massachusetts on December 20, 2009 at the age of 91. Although Stang was born in New York City in 1918, he often claimed Chelsea, Massachusetts, as his birthplace and 1925 as his birth year. His ashes were buried in Newton's cemetery. His wife, JoAnne Stang, died in September 2017, also at the age of 91.

Partial filmography
Includes all feature films, but excludes shorts and TV movies
 My Sister Eileen (1942) as Jimmy (uncredited)
 Seven Days' Leave (1942) as Bitsy Slater
 They Got Me Covered (1943) as Drugstore Boy (uncredited)
 Let's Go Steady (1945) as Chet Carson
 So This Is New York (1948) as Western Union Clerk
 Two Gals and a Guy (1951) as Bernard
 The Man with the Golden Arm (1955) as Sparrow
 Alakazam the Great (1960) as Lulipopo (voice in the English version)
 Dondi (1961) as Peewee
 The Wonderful World of the Brothers Grimm (1962) as Rumpelstiltskin
 It's a Mad, Mad, Mad, Mad World (1963) as Ray, service station co-owner
 Second Fiddle to a Steel Guitar (1965) as Jubal A. Bristol
 Pinocchio in Outer Space (1965) as Nurtle the Turtle (voice)
 Skidoo (1968) as Harry
 Hello Down There (1969) as Jonah
 Hercules in New York (1970) as Pretzie
 Marco Polo Junior Versus the Red Dragon (1972) as The Delicate Dinosaur (voice)
 Raggedy Ann & Andy: A Musical Adventure (1977) as Queasy (voice)
 I Go Pogo (1980) as Churchy LaFemme (voice)
 Ghost Dad (1990) as Mr. Cohen, elderly patient
 Dennis the Menace (1993) as Photographer

References

External links

 
 Kliph Nesteroff Salutes Arnold Stang
 NEW ROCHELLE FESTIVAL CELEBRATES THE FUNNY SIDE OF LIFE, The New York Times, March 8, 1987]
 Arnold Stang biography and radio interview (June 1974 on WTIC, Hartford, Connecticut)
 Arnold Stang radiography at Radio Gold Index
 Links to "The Henry Morgan Show" episodes (featuring Arnold Stang performances) available in mp3 format for free download at Archive.org
 Chunky ad

1918 births
2009 deaths
20th-century American male actors
21st-century American male actors
American male radio actors
American television personalities
American male voice actors
American male film actors
Male actors from Massachusetts
People from Chelsea, Massachusetts
Deaths from pneumonia in Massachusetts
People from New Rochelle, New York
Hanna-Barbera people
Famous Studios people